This is a list of extinct and extirpated animals of Spain.

Globally extinct species

Globally extinct mammals
Aurochs - human-caused
European lion - human-caused
Irish elk
Monk seal (two species endangered) -  1950; human-caused
Pyrenean ibex -  1900 in Catalonia, 2000 in Aragón (project of cloning by Advanced Cell Technology and the Aragon government, one ibex lived for 7 minutes in 2009); human-caused
Saiga antelope
Wild horse
Woolly mammoth
Woolly rhinoceros

Locally extinct species

Locally extinct mammals
Brown bear -  1980 (reintroduced in 1996); human-caused
Wolverine

Locally extinct birds
Great bustard -  1950 (some wandering individuals from Castile); human-caused

Locally extinct fish
Atlantic salmon (Salmo salar) -  1950; human-caused
Common sturgeon (Acipenser sturio) -  1950; human-caused

See also
List of extinct animals
List of extinct animals of Europe

Spain